James Wallis (died 1588) was an English politician.

He was a Member (MP) of the Parliament of England for Grantham in October 1553.

References

16th-century births
1588 deaths
English MPs 1553 (Mary I)